The 2017–18 season was FC Ararat Yerevan's 27th consecutive season in Armenian Premier League. They finished the season in sixth and last place, in the Armenian Premier League whilst being knocked out of the Armenian Cup by Shirak at the Quarterfinal stage.

Season events
At the start of July 2017, Ararat Yerevan took Brazilian defender Lucas Straub on trial. In the middle of July, Ararat announced the signing of Lucas Straub and fellow Brazilian Silas.

On 7 December 2017, Lucas Straub and Silas left Ararat after their contracts where terminated by mutual consent, whilst Erik Nazaryan and Revik Yeghiazaryan also left after their contracts expired.

On 13 February, Goran Obradović returned to Ararat Yerevan, having previously played for the club in 2009.

On 14 February 2018, Ararat signed Australian midfielder Anthony Trajkoski, whilst on 23 February, Armenian Youth International Orbeli Hamvardzumyan joined Ararat from Banants.

In March 2018, Ararat signed Andrija Dragojević, Alan Pires and Odaílson on loan from Alashkert until the end of the season.

At the end of the season, Davit Minasyan and Gevorg Ohanyan left Ararat by mutual consent, whilst Goran Obradović left after his contract expired and Andrija Dragojević, Alan Pires and Odaílson returned to Alashkert.

Squad

Transfers

In

Loans in

Released

Trialists

Friendlies

Competitions

Premier League

Results summary

Results by round

Results

Table

Armenian Cup

Statistics

Appearances and goals

|-
|colspan="14"|Players who left Ararat Yerevan during the season:

|}

Goal scorers

Clean sheets

Disciplinary Record

References

FC Ararat Yerevan seasons
Ararat Yerevan